Richard Alan Kayne is an American billionaire private equity investor and the majority owner of Kayne Anderson Capital Advisers, which he founded in 1984 and has $26 billion in assets under management.

Biography
Kayne was born to a Jewish family, the son of Ida and Jerry Kayne. In 1966, Kayne graduated with a B.S. in Statistics from Stanford University; and in 1968, he graduated with a M.B.A. from UCLA. After school, he worked as an analyst in New York and then as a principal at Cantor Fitzgerald. In 1984, Kayne co-founded Kayne Anderson Capital Advisers with John E. Anderson.

Personal life
He serves as a director of the Jewish Community Foundation of Los Angeles and is a trustee of the UCLA Foundation. He lives in Santa Monica with his wife Suzanne. As of August 2017, his net worth is estimated at $1.3 billion. He is married to Suzanne, a Los Angeles County Museum of Art trustee. They have three daughters: Jenni Kayne Ehrlich (who has her own clothing line with six stores); Maggie Kayne (who founded the Kayne Griffin Corcoran art gallery with Bill Griffin and James Corcoran; and Saree Kayne. Although his wife is not Jewish, they raised their daughters in the Jewish faith.

References

Living people
American billionaires
American investors
American Jews
Year of birth missing (living people)
1940s births